Catherine Wilson (1822 – 20 October 1862) was a British murderer who was hanged for one murder, but was generally thought at the time to have committed six others. She worked as a nurse and poisoned her victims after encouraging them to leave their money to her in their wills. She was described privately by the sentencing judge as "the greatest criminal that ever lived".

Crimes
Wilson worked as a nurse, first in Spalding, Lincolnshire, and then moving to Kirkby Lonsdale, Cumbria. She married a man called Dixon but her husband soon died, probably poisoned with colchicum, a bottle of which was found in his room. The doctor recommended an autopsy but Wilson begged him not to perform it, and he backed down.

In 1862 Wilson worked as a live-in nurse, nursing a Mrs Sarah Carnell, who rewrote her will in favour of Wilson; soon afterwards, Wilson brought her a "soothing draught", saying "Drink it down, love, it will warm you." Carnell took a mouthful and spat it out, complaining that it had burned her mouth. Later it was noticed that a hole had been burned in the bed clothes by the liquid. Wilson then fled to London, but was arrested a couple of days later.

First trial
The drink she had given to Carnell turned out to contain sulphuric acid – enough to kill 50 people. Wilson claimed that the acid had been mistakenly given to her by the pharmacist who prepared the medicine. She was tried for attempted murder but acquitted. The judge, Lord Bramwell, in the words of Wilson's lawyer Montagu Williams, Q.C., "pointed out that the theory of the defence was an untenable one, as, had the bottle contained the poison when the prisoner received it, it would have become red-hot or would have burst, before she arrived at the invalid's bedside. However, there is no accounting for juries and, at the end of the Judge's summing-up, to the astonishment probably of almost everybody in Court" she was found not guilty.

When Wilson left the dock, she was immediately rearrested, as the police had continued their investigations into Wilson and had exhumed the bodies of some former patients. She was charged with the murder of seven former patients, but tried on just one, Mrs Maria Soames, who died in 1856. Wilson denied all the charges.

Second trial
Wilson was tried on 25 September 1862 before Mr Justice Byles, again defended by Montagu Williams. During the trial it was alleged that seven people whom Wilson had lived with as nurse had died after rewriting their Wills to leave her some money, but this evidence was not admitted. Almost all had suffered from gout. Evidence of colchicine poisoning was given by toxicologist Alfred Swaine Taylor, the defence being that the poison could not be reliably detected after so long. In summing up, the judge said to the jury: "Gentlemen, if such a state of things as this were allowed to exist no living person could sit down to a meal in safety". Wilson was found guilty and sentenced to hang. A crowd of 20,000 turned out to see her execution at Newgate Gaol on 20 October 1862. She was the last woman to be publicly hanged in London.

After the trial, Byles asked Williams to come to his chambers, where he told him: "I sent for you to tell you that you did that case remarkably well. But it was no good; the facts were too strong. I prosecuted Rush for the murder of Mr Jermy, I defended Daniel Good, and I defended several other notable criminals when I was on the Norfolk Circuit; but, if it will be of any satisfaction to you, I may tell you that in my opinion you have to-day defended the greatest criminal that ever lived."

Public reaction to crimes
Wilson's punishment, the first death sentence handed down to a woman by the Central Criminal Court in 14 years, drew little condemnation. In the view of Harper's Weekly, "From the age of fourteen to that of forty-three her career was one of undeviating yet complex vice [...] She was as foul in life as bloody in hand, and she seems not to have spared the poison draught even to the partners of her adultery and sensuality. Hers was an undeviating career of the foulest personal vices and the most cold-blooded and systematic murders, as well as deliberate and treacherous robberies." It was generally thought that Wilson was guilty of more crimes than the one she was convicted of. Harper's went on:

See also
 John Bodkin Adams
 Dorothea Waddingham
 List of serial killers by country

References

External links
 Old Bailey trial records
 Life, Trial, Sentence, and Execution of Catherine Wilson, for the Murder of Mrs Soames

1822 births
1856 murders in the United Kingdom
1862 deaths
1862 murders in the United Kingdom
19th-century executions by England and Wales
Executed English people
Executed English women
Nurses convicted of killing patients
People executed for murder
Poisoners
Suspected serial killers
Women of the Victorian era